A by-election to the French National Assembly was held in the Comoros on 4 March 1962, following the resignation of Saïd Mohamed Cheikh after he became Comorian Prime Minister. The result was a victory for Mohamed Ahmed of the List for the Fifth Republic.

Results

References

Comoros
Elections in the Comoros
1962 in the Comoros
By-elections to the National Assembly (France)
March 1962 events in Africa